James Harting Madole (July 7, 1927 – May 6, 1979) was a prominent fascist and leader of the National Renaissance Party in the United States. He is now recognized as a pivotal figure in the development of post-war occult-fascism.

Biography
In 1945, Madole founded the Animist Party. By 1947, it had dissolved. 

Madole founded the National Renaissance Party in New York City in 1948. The name was inspired by Adolf Hitler's "Last Political Testament" before his suicide, which hoped for a "radiant renaissance" for Nazism. 

Madole at the time was "a balding shipping clerk in his mid-forties who lived with his mother, a raving anti-Semite", according to Martin A. Lee, and Madole "could be seen haranguing some two dozen followers in the Yorkville section of Manhattan, where many German immigrants lived". The group wore Nazi storm-trooper uniforms and drew hecklers, leading to fistfights.

Another description of Madole is provided by Peter Levenda: 
"Madole was a relatively congenial human being in polite company. Completely bald, he bore a scar that he claimed was the result of a brick thrown at him by a demonstrator… He possessed a thorough knowledge of the war and was fascinated by stories of the heroism shown by German troops in combat, particularly against the Russian Army. He had a serious junk food habit, downing enormous quantities of ice cream and milk shakes, and grinned (or grimaced?) at inappropriate times…"

The National Renaissance Party ended in 1981, with the death of Madole's mother, Grace Hartung Madole.

Beliefs
Madole was influenced by Aryanism and Hinduism. He wrote that the Aryan race was of great antiquity and had been worshipped worldwide by lower races as "White Gods". Madole also wrote that the Aryans originated in the Garden of Eden located in North America. He also believed that America was the "new Atlantis" and "the cradle of a new God like race".

A central tenant of Madole's ideology was space travel, believing that "the future of Man lies in the stars". Madole was one of the few to accept Francis P. Yockey's argument that Soviet Bolshevism had preserved traditional values more than western liberalism, and that communism was not supported by Judaism.

See also
Andrej Lisanik
Dan Burros
Esoteric Nazism
Kerry Bolton
George Lincoln Rockwell
H. Keith Thompson
Francis Parker Yockey
Matthias Koehl

References

 Selected Writings of James H. Madole, edited by Kerry Bolton (find here)
 Dreamer of the Day: Francis Parker Yockey and the postwar fascist international (chapter 42 in particular) by Kevin Coogan (Autonomedia, Brooklyn, NY, 1998)

External links
 After the Third Age: Eschatological Elements of Postwar International Fascism
 THE NEO-NAZI FACE OF THE EXTREME RIGHT, chapter 6 of The Other Radicalism
Preliminary Report on Neo-Fascist and Other Hate Groups; U.S. House of Representatives Committee on Un-American Activities, Dec. 17, 1954 
James Madole's FBI files, obtained under the FOIA and hosted at the Internet Archive:
FBI headquarters file part 1
FBI headquarters file part 2
FBI headquarters file part 3
San Francisco office file

1927 births
1979 deaths
20th-century far-right politicians in the United States
American neo-Nazis
Pseudohistorians
American political party founders
Neo-Nazi politicians in the United States